The Third Addition to Rockville and Old St. Mary's Church and Cemetery is a historic area located in Rockville, Montgomery County, Maryland. This area combines 19th century residential scale buildings with a tree-lined narrow street, country church, weathered headstones, Victorian Gothic railroad station, and a brick cast-iron front commercial structure, to create an atmosphere that evokes the era when the station served as the gateway to Rockville. In addition to Victorian Gothic, architectural styles used in residential buildings include Queen Anne, Georgian, and Colonial Revival. The area was listed on the National Register of Historic Places in 1978.

St. Mary's Church is significant as the County's first brick Roman Catholic church, and the handsome hardware store is the area's last surviving cast-iron brick commercial structure.  The Old St. Mary's Church Cemetery is the final resting place of author F. Scott Fitzgerald, his wife Zelda Fitzgerald and their daughter Frances Fitzgerald.

Gallery

References

External links

, including photo in 2003, at Maryland Historical Trust website
Boundary Map for Third Addition to Rockville and Old St. Mary's Church and Cemetery, Montgomery County
Peerless Rockville Information Page
"Gatsby author's final resting place is at St. Mary's Cemetery, Rockville," My Catholic Standard, by Carol Zimmermann, July 20, 2010.

Historic districts on the National Register of Historic Places in Maryland
Roman Catholic cemeteries in the United States
Historic districts in Montgomery County, Maryland
Gothic Revival architecture in Maryland
Victorian architecture in Maryland
Georgian architecture in Maryland
Colonial Revival architecture in Maryland
Queen Anne architecture in Maryland
Buildings and structures in Rockville, Maryland
National Register of Historic Places in Montgomery County, Maryland
Religion in Rockville, Maryland